Măceșu de Sus is a commune in Dolj County, Oltenia, Romania with a population of 1,678 people. It is composed of a single village, Măceșu de Sus.

References

Communes in Dolj County
Localities in Oltenia